Gary Beadle (born 8 July 1965) is a British actor, best known for playing Paul Trueman in EastEnders and Gary Barwick in Operation Good Guys.

Life and career
Beadle was raised as one of five children in Bermondsey, South London, where he was baptised a Roman Catholic. As children, he and his elder brother Rikki produced a version of the 1976 youth musical-gangster film Bugsy Malone for Southwark London Borough Council. Directed by Rikki who starred as Talula, Gary played janitor Fizzy. Rikki tried to invite the original film's director Alan Parker to the performance, but his assistant did come, and used her connections to get Rikki, Gary and their younger sister into the community-based Anna Scher Theatre school.

After developing a love of hip hop, and especially Run-D.M.C. and the Sugarhill Gang, Beadle moved to New York City in his early twenties. On his return to London, using the moniker 'Pretty Boy Gee', he formed a rap group called The City Limits Crew alongside 'Little Stevie Bee'. In 1985, the duo released two 12" singles, 'Keep It On' (w/ 'The Mutant Rockers') and 'Fresher Than Ever' on the independent record label 'Survival Records'. Also that year, the crew recorded a session on BBC Radio 1 for John Peel and performed at 'Electro Rock', an international hip hop event at the Hippodrome.

He also worked as a comedian but started to work as an actor, and appeared in The Young Ones (BBC 1984); the 1986 film Absolute Beginners; Jerusalem, the 1987 short film starring the Style Council pop group; Making Out in 1989–91 as Simon; the BBC sitcom Absolutely Fabulous, where he played the gay lover of Eddie's (Jennifer Saunders) ex-husband Justin; the TV series Born to Run in 1997; the ITV police drama The Bill and BBC medical drama Casualty (2001).

In 2001 he started in the role of Paul Trueman in EastEnders. A loveable rogue, Beadle left the role when his contract was due to terminate - as he had not appreciated the director and script writers wanting his character to become a drug dealer. He therefore departed from the show and his exit featured the character being killed off by his gangland boss Andy Hunter (Michael Higgs).

Immediately after completing filming of EastEnders, Beadle playing the Evil Queen's henchman in the Qdos Entertainment production of Snow White at the Cliffs Pavilion in Southend-on-Sea, opposite Linda Lusardi. Since leaving EastEnders, Beadle has roles in Holby City (2005), Doctors (2006) and the Jean-Claude Van Damme film Til Death, released in 2007.

In 2007, he appeared in BBC Three comedy Thieves Like Us. His brother is actor, writer and performer Rikki Beadle-Blair. In 2008 he appeared in The Sarah Jane Adventures series 2 as Clyde Langer's father, Paul. In 2009 he appeared in Malice in Wonderland as dj Felix Chester, a Cheshire Cat allusion. In 2010 he appeared in the Royal Court Theatre's Sucker Punch by Roy Williams.

In 2012 he appeared in Hustle as a police officer. In 2015 he played Docker in BBC One drama The Interceptor and also featured in the Ron Howard-directed movie In the Heart of the Sea which was released in December 2015.

In 2016, he performed as Abioseh, an ex-tribesman in the Royal National Theatre's production of Les Blancs. He also starred as a Detective Chief Inspector in an episode of Silent Witness.

In 2017, Beadle appeared as Archdeacon Gabriel Atubo, Rev. Sidney Chambers's boss in Series 3 of Grantchester.

Filmography

 Absolute Beginners (1986)
 Til Death (2007)
 Malice in Wonderland (2009)
 In the Heart of the Sea (2015)
The Toll (2021)
 Persuasion (2022)

Television

 The Young Ones (1984)
 Casualty (1987, 2001 & 2010)
 Making Out (1989–1991)
 Absolutely Fabulous (1992–1996)
 Born to Run (1997) 
 Operation Good Guys (1997–1999)
 The Bill (1999)
 EastEnders (2001–2004)
 Holby City (2005)
 Doctors (2006)
 Kerching! (2006)
 Silent Witness (2007)
 Thieves Like Us (2007)
 The Sarah Jane Adventures (2008)
 Hustle (2012)
 The Interceptor (2015)
 Silent Witness (2016)
 Death in Paradise Series 6 episode 3 "The Impossible Murder" (2017)
 Grantchester (2017)
 Summer of Rockets  (2019)
 Around the World in 80 Days (2021) - Bass Reeves
 Andor (2022)

References

External links

1965 births
Living people
English people of Jamaican descent
Male actors from London
People from Bermondsey
Alumni of the Anna Scher Theatre School
English male soap opera actors
English male film actors
English male television actors
English male voice actors
Black British male actors
20th-century English male actors
21st-century English male actors
English Roman Catholics